Phan Thanh Hậu (born 12 January 1997) is a Vietnamese footballer who plays as a central midfielder for V-League2 (Vietnam) club Bà Rịa Vũng Tàu, on loan from Hồ Chí Minh City.

He is a product of the Hoang Anh Gia Lai – Arsenal JMG Academy, a joint football academy built by English club Arsenal, JMG Academy, and the Vietnamese cooperation Hoang Anh Gia Lai Group. In 2014, after his performance as a member of the Vietnam U-19 national team at 2014 AFC U-19 Championship, Thanh Hậu was listed by The Guardian as one of the 40 best young football talents in the world.

International goals

U23

Honours
Vietnam U21
International U-21 Thanh Niên Newspaper Cup: Runner-up 2017
Vietnam U19
AFF U-19 Youth Championship: Runner-up 2013, 2014
Hassanal Bolkiah Trophy: Runner-up 2014

External links

References 

1997 births
Living people
Vietnamese footballers
Association football midfielders
V.League 1 players
Hoang Anh Gia Lai FC players
Ho Chi Minh City FC players
People from Quảng Ngãi province